Each Pearl a Tear is a surviving 1916 American drama silent film directed by George Melford and written by Beatrice DeMille and Leighton Osmun. The film stars Fannie Ward, Charles Clary, Jack Dean, Paul Weigel, Jane Wolfe and Ben Alexander. The film was released on August 31, 1916, by Paramount Pictures.

Plot
A woman named Diane Winston (Fannie Ward) is introduced, by her father, to an unscrupulous stockbroker. But Diane is already in love with someone else, the stockbroker's secretary named John Clarke. The stockbroker loans an expensive pearl necklace to Diane and she gives it to John to return to the stockbroker. The stockbroker pretends to have not received the necklace back. Her father dies from shock, and Diane decides to work for the stockbroker in order to pay back her debt to him. John decides to enter the stock-market to raise money. The stockbroker tries to use his money to destroy John's chances. Diane finds the necklace in the stockbroker's office and realizes he lied about it. She takes it and sells it and gives the money to John. He uses the money to fight against the stockbroker's attacks and ends up making a lot of money on the market so that they can make plans for marriage.

Cast 
Fannie Ward as Diane Winston
Charles Clary as Pul Lorillard
Jack Dean as John Clarke
Paul Weigel as Roger Winston
Jane Wolfe as Mrs. Van Sant 
Ben Alexander

Preservation status
The film is preserved in the Library of Congress collection, Packard Campus for Audio-Visual Conservation .

References

External links 
 
 

1916 films
1910s English-language films
Silent American drama films
1916 drama films
Paramount Pictures films
Films directed by George Melford
American black-and-white films
American silent feature films
1910s American films